SM UB-43 was a Type UB II submarine or U-boat for the German Imperial Navy during World War I. UB-43 was sold to the Austro-Hungarian Navy ( or ) during the war. In Austro-Hungarian service the B was dropped from her name and she was known as SM U-43 or U-XLIII as the lead boat of the Austro-Hungarian U-43 class.

UB-43 was ordered in July 1915 and was laid down at the AG Weser shipyard in Bremen in September. She was equipped to carry a complement of four torpedoes for her two bow torpedo tubes and had an  deck gun. As part of a group of six submarines selected for Mediterranean service, UB-43 was broken into railcar sized components and shipped to Pola where she was assembled and launched in early April 1916, and commissioned later in the month. Over the next year the U-boat sank twenty-two ships, which included the Peninsular and Oriental liner . UB-43 also damaged the British protected cruiser .

The German Imperial Navy was having difficulties filling submarine crews with trained men and offered to sell UB-43 and a sister boat, to the Austro-Hungarian Navy. After the terms were agreed to in June 1917, both boats were handed over at Pola. When commissioned into the Austro-Hungarian Navy, the B in her designation was dropped so that she became U-43 or U-XLIII. She damaged one Italian steamer in limited Austro-Hungarian service through the end of the war. U-43 was ceded to France as a war reparation in 1920 and broken at Bizerta that same year.

Design and construction 
The German UB II design improved upon the design of the UB I boats, which had been ordered in September 1914. In service, the UB I boats were found to be too small and too slow. A major problem was that, because they had a single propeller shaft/engine combo, if either component failed, the U-boat became almost totally disabled. To rectify this flaw, the UB II boats featured twin propeller shafts and twin engines (one shaft for each engine), which also increased the U-boat's top speed. The new design also included more powerful batteries, larger torpedo tubes, and a deck gun. As a UB II boat, U-43 could also carry twice the torpedo load of her UB I counterparts, and nearly ten times as much fuel. To accommodate all of these changes the boats' had larger hulls, and surface and submerged displacements more than twice those of the UB I boats.

She had a single hull with saddle tanks and had a draft of  when surfaced. She displaced  while submerged but only  on the surface.

The submarine was equipped with twin Daimler diesel engines and twin Siemens-Schuckert electric motors—for surfaced and submerged running, respectively—that drove one  propeller shaft.

UB-43 was equipped with two  bow torpedo tubes and could carry four torpedoes. The U-boat was also armed with one  Uk L/30 deck gun.

UB-43 was laid down by AG Weser at its Bremen shipyard on 3 September 1915. As one of six U-boats selected for service in the Mediterranean while under construction, UB-43 was broken into railcar-sized components and shipped overland to the Austro-Hungarian port of Pola. Shipyard workers from Weser assembled the boat and her five sisters at Pola, where she was launched on 8 April.

German Imperial Navy career 
SM UB-43 was commissioned into the German Imperial Navy on 24 April 1916 under the command of Oberleutnant zur See Dietrich Niebuhr; UB-43 was the only U-boat command for the 27-year-old officer. UB-43 was assigned to the Navy's Pola Flotilla in which she remained throughout her German career. Although the flotilla was based in Pola, the site of the main Austro-Hungarian Navy base, boats of the flotilla operated out of the Austro-Hungarian base at Cattaro which was located farther south and closer to the Mediterranean. German U-boats typically returned to Pola only for repairs.

Under Niebuhr's command, UB-43 had no success, and he was replaced by Kapitänleutnant Hans-Joachim von Mellenthin on 29 August. After two weeks under von Mellenthin's command, UB-43 sank her first ship. Three days later, and some  closer to Malta, von Mellenthin sank a pair of British steamers. Dewa was in ballast headed for Port Said when attacked by UB-43; three of the steamer's crew lost their lives in the attack. Lord Tredegar was carrying a general cargo when she was sent down with the loss of four men. The Wall Street Journal reported that the sinking of Lord Tredegar resulted in a loss of $1,000,000 for her American insurer.

In October, von Mellenthin and UB-43 sank an additional two ships. On 10 October, the British tanker Elax, carrying fuel oil from Rangoon was sunk off Cape Matapan without casualties.

On 18 November, the British Admiralty, released a report that listed all of UB-43s first five victims as evidence of German wrongdoing. According to the British report, Italiana, Dewa, Lord Tredegar, and Elax—four of the twenty-two ships listed—had all been torpedoed without warning. This type of attack was counter to German pledges to adhere cruiser warfare, which required that ships be allowed time for the crews to escape before any attack could commence. UB-43s fifth victim, Welsh Prince, was on another list of 107 British ships sunk whose lifeboats had been fired upon by German submarines.

In the meantime, UB-43 had continued sinking British ships, sending down five in a nine-day span in early November. The following day, the 3,937 GRT Clan Leslie and the 5,398 GRT Huntsvale were sunk in the same area. Clan Leslie was carrying a general cargo from Bombay when sunk with three casualties. Seven were killed when Huntsvale, traveling in ballast for Algiers, was sunk.

According to contemporary news accounts, gunners on Arabia fired upon UB-43 after the liner was torpedoed, but recorded no hits. All 437 passengers aboard the steamer, en route from Sydney to London when attacked, were rescued after an hour in the water. The liner went down 90 minutes after the torpedo struck. Eleven died in the attack, including two of Arabias engineers killed in the initial blast of the torpedo. Six days after Arabias sinking, UB-43 sank the 3,383 GRT British steamer Kapunda east of Malta. Kapundas loss brought the U-boat's November tally to 26,774 gross register tons, which accounted for more than 15% of the November tally for all German U-boats in the Mediterranean.

UB-43 and von Mellenthin sank three more British steamers in December: Bretwalda on the 13th, and Russian and Westminster on the 14th. Russian, at 8,825 GRT, was the largest ship sunk by UB-43; the horse transport ship was sailing in ballast from Salonica when she went down with 28 of her crewmen. After UB-43 torpedoed Westminster, the U-boat shelled the survivors in their lifeboats, according to authors R. H. Gibson and Maurice Prendergast. Fifteen men from Westminster died in the sinking.

UB-43 sank no ships over the next eight weeks. Author Paul Halpern reports that the majority of the German U-boats in the Mediterranean fleet were undergoing repairs and refits at Pola and Cattaro during January. Although no specific mention is made of repairs done on UB-43, the U-boat's inactivity in this period may be for that reason.

Unrestricted submarine warfare 
On 1 February 1917, Kaiser Wilhelm II personally approved a resumption of unrestricted submarine warfare in order to try to force the British to make peace. The new rules of engagement specified that no ship was to be left afloat, although British reports for several of UB-43s victims suggest that von Mellenthin was already operating in this manner.

Under these new rules of engagement, UB-43 first sank the Greek steamer Miaoulis  from Benghazi on 24 February, while she was carrying cottonseed to London. Two days later, the turret hull steamer Clan Farquhar, carrying cotton and coal for London, was torpedoed and sunk. After the attack, which killed 49 of her crew, the ship's second engineer was taken captive by von Mellenthin. On the 27th, Brodmore and her cargo of frozen meat from Majunga were sunk off Libya (and her master taken prisoner), and on the 28th the Japanese steamer Shinsei Maru was sunk nearby.

She was nearly a month later before von Mellenthin and UB-43 sank their next target. On 26 March, the British steamer Ledbury, carrying wheat from Karachi, was sunk  from Benghazi. On 9 April, von Mellenthin was succeeded by Oblt.z.S. Horst Obermüller, a 26-year-old first time U-boat commander. Under von Mellenthin's command, UB-43 had sunk  of merchant shipping.

On 1 May, Obermüller sank the American-owned (but British-flagged) tanker British Sun carrying a load of fuel oil. According to a report in The New York Times, the 5,565 GRT vessel, valued at $2,500,000, was "one of the finest" tankers. The collier Repton was sent down off Cape Matapan six days later; three of the British steamer's crewmen died in the attack. Later in the month, the Greek steamer Dorothy and her cargo of wheat from Karachi were sunk  from Cap D'Armi. Grafton was damaged but suffered no casualties. The -displacement British ship was brought safely into port at Malta.

On 21 July, UB-43 was decommissioned at Pola and handed over to the Austro-Hungarian Navy.

Austro-Hungarian Navy service 
In November 1916, the German Imperial Navy, having a hard time finding trained submarine crews, inquired to find out if its ally Austria-Hungary was interested in purchasing some of its Mediterranean submarines. A general agreement led to protracted negotiations, which stalled over the outflow of Austro-Hungarian gold reserves to Germany. But, with all of the details worked out, the two parties agreed on the sale of UB-43 and sister ship  to Austria-Hungary in June 1917.

When handed over by the Germans on 21 July, UB-43 was in a "worn out condition". Despite the rough condition of the boat, the U-boat was commissioned into the Austro-Hungarian Navy on 30 July 1917 as SM U-43, dropping the B from her former designation. Linienschiffsleutnant Friedrich Schlosser was installed as the new commander of the U-boat, which remained at Pola for the next three months undergoing repairs. Departing that port on 1 November, U-43 made way to Cattaro, and then went out on patrol. Schlosser torpedoed the Italian steamer Orione on 16 November, but the Italian ship did not sink; she was towed to safety in Taranto.

On 30 November, a leak on U-43 partially flooded the boat and caused her to sink to a depth of  before she was brought under control and raised to the surface. The flooding damaged the U-boat's electrical systems, preventing her from submerging on her return to port for repairs. An unidentified submarine launched a torpedo at the surfaced U-43, but the torpedo's aim was off and it passed harmlessly in front of the bow. The boat made port at Cattaro on 1 December and at Pola on 6 December for two months of repairs.

During U-43s time under repair, Schlosser was reassigned to command , and Linienschiffsleutnant Eugen Hornyák Edler von Horn was named to take his place aboard U-43 on 18 January 1918. Under von Horn, U-43 patrolled off Cattaro, having to crash dive at least once to escape attack from enemy torpedo boats. On 17 March, while returning to Cattaro from patrol, the crew of the Austro-Hungarian destroyer  mistook U-43 for an enemy submarine and rammed her, damaging the diving planes. U-43 sailed for Fiume for three months of repairs.

The U-boat returned to action in June and patrolled off Montenegro, Durazzo, and Cattaro for the next five months. On 13 June, U-43 was slightly damaged in an air raid on Cattaro and, on 5 September, had to crash dive to avoid another air attack while off Cattaro. On 20 September, the boat rendezvoused with U-47 and received a French prisoner of war. The prisoner was the only survivor of the French submarine , which U-47 had torpedoed the night before.

At the end of the war, U-43 was at Cattaro. In her Austro-Hungarian Navy career, U-43 damaged a single merchant ship of 4,016 gross register tons. U-43 was ceded to France as a war reparation in 1920, towed to Bizerta, and broken up there within a year.

Summary of raiding history

As the German UB-43

As the Austro-Hungarian U-43

Notes

References

Bibliography 

 
 
 
 
 
 

 
 
 

 
 

German Type UB II submarines
U-boats commissioned in 1916
U-43-class submarines (Austria-Hungary)
U-boats commissioned in 1917
World War I submarines of Germany
1916 ships